Narlı is a village in the Sincik District, Adıyaman Province, Turkey. The village is populated by Kurds of the Reşwan tribe and had a population of 214 in 2021.

The hamlet of Akdağ is attached to Narlı.

References

Villages in Sincik District
Kurdish settlements in Adıyaman Province